Maloi is a village located near Thul in Sindh province, Pakistan.

There is one tribe who is living in Maloi (Bahrani).

References

Populated places in Jacobabad District